Ivan Alexeyevich Yermenyov (1746–?) was a Russian painter.

Biography
Ivan Yermenyov was born in 1746.

In 1767 he graduated from the Imperial Academy of Arts.

His date of death is uncertain, but believed to be sometime after 1797.

Works
The most notable work of the artist is a series of eight watercolors known as "Beggars".

Gallery

External links
 Ерменев Иван Алексеевич. VESNART.ru

1746 births
18th-century painters from the Russian Empire